This is a list of Croatian television related events from 2010.

Events
4 June - 16-year-old Kim Verson wins the second season of Hrvatska traži zvijezdu.
17 December - 21-year-old singer Viktorija Novosel wins the second season of Supertalent
18 December - Singer and actress Nera Stipičević and her partner Damir Horvatinčić win the fifth season of Ples sa zvijezdama.

Debuts

Television shows

2000s
Ples sa zvijezdama (2006-2013)
Hrvatska traži zvijezdu (2009-2011)
Supertalent (2009-2011, 2016–present)

Ending this year

Births

Deaths